The passion fruit is the fruit of a number of plants in the genus Passiflora.

Etymology 

The passion fruit is so called because it is one of the many species of passion flower, the English translation of the Latin genus name, Passiflora, and may be spelled "passion fruit", "passionfruit", or "passion-fruit". Around 1700, the name was given by missionaries in Brazil as an educational aid while trying to convert the indigenous inhabitants to Christianity; its name was flor das cinco chagas or "flower of the five wounds" to illustrate the crucifixion of Christ and his resurrection, with other plant components also named after an emblem in the Passion of Jesus.

History 
The passion fruit was first introduced to Europe in 1553.

Appearance and structure
Passion fruits are round or oval, and range from a width of 1.5 to 3 inches. They can be yellow, red, purple, and green. The fruits have a juicy edible center composed of a large number of seeds.

Varieties
Well known edible passion fruits can be divided into four main types:
 purple passion fruit (fruits of Passiflora edulis Sims),
 yellow passion fruit (Passiflora edulis f. flavicarpa Deg.),
 sweet granadilla (Passiflora ligularis),
 giant granadilla (Passiflora quadrangularis L.).

Uses
The part of the fruit that is used (eaten) is the pulpy juicy seeds. Passion fruits can also be squeezed to make juice.

Nutrition

Raw passion fruit is 73% water, 23% carbohydrates, 2% protein, and 1% fat (table). In a 100 gram reference amount, raw passion fruit supplies 97 calories, and is a rich source of vitamin C (36% of the Daily Value, DV) and a moderate source of riboflavin (11% DV), niacin (10% DV), iron (12% DV), and phosphorus (10% DV) (table). No other micronutrients are in significant content.

Phytochemicals
Several varieties of passionfruit are rich in polyphenols, and some contain prunasin and other cyanogenic glycosides in the peel and juice.

Gallery

See also
Fassionola
POG juice

References

Tropical fruit